Dum Dum Motijheel College, established in 1950, is a bachelor's degree college in Kolkata, India. It offers undergraduate courses in Science and Arts.  It is affiliated to West Bengal State University.

Departments

Science

Chemistry
Physics
Mathematics 
Botany
Zoology
Statistics
Computer Science
Microbiology
Molecular Biology
Electronics

Arts

Bengali
English
Sanskrit
History
Geography
Political Science
Philosophy
Economics
Education
Journalism
Human Development

Accreditation
Dum Dum Motijheel College is recognized by the University Grants Commission (UGC). It was accredited by the National Assessment and Accreditation Council (NAAC), and awarded B++ grade, an accreditation that has since then expired.

See also
Education in India
List of colleges in West Bengal
Education in West Bengal

References

External links
Dum Dum Motijheel College 

Educational institutions established in 1950
Colleges affiliated to West Bengal State University
Universities and colleges in North 24 Parganas district
1950 establishments in West Bengal